Caryocolum simulans is a moth of the family Gelechiidae. It is found in Syria.

The length of the forewings is 5–6 mm.

References

Moths described in 1988
simulans
Moths of Asia